Mimoperadectes is an extinct genus of didelphimorph marsupial from the Eocene of North America.

References

Prehistoric marsupial genera
Extinct mammals of North America
Eocene marsupials
Fossil taxa described in 1979